Indiantown Road is a  east–west road connecting inner Palm Beach County, with Florida's Turnpike, Interstate 95, and U.S. Route 1 in Jupiter, Florida. The road was formerly entirely designated as State Road 706 (SR 706), but majority of it has been transferred to local jurisdiction and is signed as County Road 706 (CR 706).

Route description

West of Jupiter
As the road enters more civilization, it widens to become a divided boulevard with two lanes in each direction. It is not until an intersection with the Florida's Turnpike ramps that the road becomes three lanes in each direction and the speed limit decreases.

Jupiter
State Road 706 begins at the interchange between Florida's Turnpike and Indiantown Road in Jupiter, with SR 706 heading east, with the interchange with Interstate 95  from the Turnpike.  East of I-95, Indiantown Road becomes a commercial road from here to the eastern terminus.  It has intersections with Central Boulevard and Center Street, major roads in the town of Jupiter, along with county road Alternate A1A.  Continuing east, it has a junction with Military Trail, followed by SR 811 in central Jupiter.  The road then crosses a major drawbridge over the Intracoastal Waterway, and then intersects with US 1. Indiantown Road continues east under county maintenance (as CR 706) to County Road A1A, though this section of Indiantown Road is erroneously signed as "to SR A1A."

History
Originally, SR 706 spanned  from Bee Line Highway (SR 710) near Indiantown to its present eastern terminus.  In the mid-1970s, Florida Department of Transportation downgraded the section west of the Turnpike to secondary status (and placed "S" stickers on the SR 706 signs), starting a sequence of events that started the reversion of the western segment to county control.  This was part of a large set of transformations that particularly affected Florida south of State Road 70.

While SR 706 was primarily a rural road as recently as the 1980s, the region has become urbanized in recent years as the population growth of Florida Gold Coast and nearby Treasure Coast has been transforming the Atlantic coast of Florida south of Kennedy Space Center.

Major intersections

References

External links

706
706
706